The 1968 Allan Cup was the Canadian senior ice hockey championship for the 1967–68 senior "A" season.  The event was hosted by the St. Boniface Mohawks and Winnipeg, Manitoba.  The 1968 playoff marked the 60th time that the Allan Cup has been awarded.

Teams
Victoriaville Tigres (Eastern Canadian Champions)
St. Boniface Mohawks (Western Canadian Champions)

Playdowns

Allan Cup Best-of-Seven Series
Victoriaville Tigres 6 - St. Boniface Mohawks 2
St. Boniface Mohawks 5 - Victoriaville Tigres 1
Victoriaville Tigres 4 - St. Boniface Mohawks 1
Victoriaville Tigres 7 - St. Boniface Mohawks 2
Victoriaville Tigres 2 - St. Boniface Mohawks 0

Eastern Playdowns
Quarter-final
Corner Brook Royals defeated Morrisburg Combines 3-games-to-1
Morrisburg Combines 7 - Corner Brook Royals 4
Corner Brook Royals 6 - Morrisburg Combines 4
Corner Brook Royals 4 - Morrisburg Combines 1
Corner Brook Royals 10 - Morrisburg Combines 0
Semi-final
Victoriaville Tigres defeated Corner Brook Royals 3-games-to-1
Victoriaville Tigres 15 - Corner Brook Royals 1
Victoriaville Tigres 9 - Corner Brook Royals 2
Corner Brook Royals 6 - Victoriaville Tigres 1
Victoriaville Tigres 3 - Corner Brook Royals 0
Final
Victoriaville Tigres defeated Toronto Marlboros 4-games-to-none
Victoriaville Tigres 5 - Toronto Marlboros 1
Victoriaville Tigres 6 - Toronto Marlboros 2
Victoriaville Tigres 4 - Toronto Marlboros 1
Victoriaville Tigres 6 - Toronto Marlboros 4

Western Playdowns
Quarter-final
Drumheller Miners defeated Spokane Jets 3-games-to-1
Drumheller Miners 7 - Spokane Jets 4
Drumheller Miners 2 - Spokane Jets 1
Spokane Jets3  - Drumheller Miners 0
Drumheller Miners 3 - Spokane Jets 2
Pacific Semi-final
Drumheller Miners defeated Saskatoon Quakers 3-games-to-1
Saskatoon Quakers 3 - Drumheller Miners 2
Drumheller Miners 2 - Saskatoon Quakers 1
Drumheller Miners 5 - Saskatoon Quakers 4
Drumheller Miners 5 - Saskatoon Quakers 4
West Semi-final
St. Boniface Mohawks defeated Port Arthur Bearcats 3-games-to-1
St. Boniface Mohawks 6 - Port Arthur Bearcats 3
St. Boniface Mohawks 7 - Port Arthur Bearcats 4
Port Arthur Bearcats 6 - St. Boniface Mohawks 3
St. Boniface Mohawks 5 - Port Arthur Bearcats 4
Final
St. Boniface Mohawks defeated Drumheller Miners 3-games-to-none
St. Boniface Mohawks 4 - Drumheller Miners 3
St. Boniface Mohawks 4 - Drumheller Miners 2
St. Boniface Mohawks 6 - Drumheller Miners 0

External links
Allan Cup archives 
Allan Cup website

Allan Cup
Allan Cup 1968